Erpetogomphus heterodon, the dashed ringtail, is a species of dragonfly in the family Gomphidae. It is found in Mexico and the United States. Its natural habitat is rivers.

References

Gomphidae
Taxonomy articles created by Polbot
Insects described in 1994